The European Board of Ophthalmology (EBO) is the European professional association for ophthalmology.

Founded in London in 1992, it is a specialised agency of the European Union of Medical Specialists (UEMS). EBO aims to harmonise standards and improve the quality of ophthalmology training across Europe.

Examinations
EBO awards the title Fellow of the European Board of Ophthalmology (FEBO) upon success in a specialist clinical examination. In some European countries this test replaces the national certification examination.

References

Ophthalmology organizations
Medical and health organizations based in Europe